The  Little League World Series took place between August 22 and August 26 in Williamsport, Pennsylvania. The Taipei Little League of Taipei City, Taiwan, defeated the Edison Little League of Hammond, Indiana, in the championship game of the 26th Little League World Series.

Teams

Championship bracket

Consolation Bracket

External links
1972 Little League World Series
Line scores for the 1972 LLWS

Little League World Series
Little League World Series
Little League World Series